Shirley June Fry Irvin (née Fry; June 30, 1927 – July 13, 2021) was an American tennis player. During her career, which lasted from the early 1940s until the mid-1950s, she won the singles title at all four Grand Slam events, as well as 13 doubles titles, and was ranked No. 1 in the world in 1956.

Early life
Fry was born in Akron, Ohio, on June 30, 1927.  She started playing tennis competitively at age nine. She was educated at Rollins College in Winter Park, Florida, graduating in 1949.

Career
Fry was one of 10 women to have won each Grand Slam singles tournament at least once during her career. She was also one of seven women (with Hart, Court, Navratilova, Pam Shriver, Serena Williams, and Venus Williams) to have won all four Grand Slam doubles tournaments. At the U.S. National Championship (precursor of the U.S. Open) in 1942, Fry reached the singles quarterfinals at the age of 15. At Wimbledon in 1953, Fry and Hart lost only four games during the entire women's doubles tournament and won three matches without losing a game, including the semifinals and finals, the latter over Connolly and Julia Sampson. Fry won the last three Grand Slam singles tournaments she entered, including wins over Althea Gibson in the Wimbledon quarterfinal and U.S. Championship final in 1956 and the Australian Championships final in 1957.

Fry was ranked in the world top 10 in 1946 and 1948 and from 1950 through 1955 (no rankings issued from 1940 through 1945), and No. 1 in 1956. The United States Lawn Tennis Association ranked her in the U.S. top 10 from 1944 through 1955 and No. 1 in 1956.  She briefly retired in early 1956 and worked as a copygirl for the St. Petersburg Times.  However, she returned later that spring after receiving an invitation to play in the Wightman Cup.  She retired for the final time in 1957, and was inducted into the International Tennis Hall of Fame in 1970.

From 1951 through 1956, Fry participated in the Wightman Cup, the women's team competition between Great Britain and the United States, and contributed to the U.S. victory during each of these editions with the exception of 1954, when her final doubles rubber was not played. She compiled a 10–2 win–loss record.

Later life
Fry married Karl Irvin in Australia in February 1957, after which she retired from top-level tennis.  They remained married until his death from a heart attack in 1976.  Together, they had four children: Mark, Scott, Lori and Karen.

Fry resided in Naples, Florida, during her later years.  She died there on the night of July 13, 2021, at the age of 94. Prior to her death, she was the longest surviving female Grand Slam tournament and Wimbledon singles champion.

Career statistics

Grand Slam tournament timelines
Sources:

Singles

Doubles

R = tournament restricted to French nationals and held under German occupation.
1In 1946 and 1947, the French Championships were held after Wimbledon.

Grand Slam tournament finals
Source:

Singles: 8 (4 titles, 4 runners-up)

Doubles: 19 (12 titles, 7 runners-up)

Mixed doubles: 5 (1 title, 4 runners-up)

See also 
 Performance timelines for all female tennis players who reached at least one Grand Slam final

Notes

References

External links

 

1927 births
2021 deaths
American female tennis players
Australian Championships (tennis) champions
French Championships (tennis) champions
Sportspeople from Akron, Ohio
Rollins Tars women's tennis players
International Tennis Hall of Fame inductees
Tennis people from Ohio
United States National champions (tennis)
Wimbledon champions (pre-Open Era)
Grand Slam (tennis) champions in women's singles
Grand Slam (tennis) champions in women's doubles
Grand Slam (tennis) champions in mixed doubles
World number 1 ranked female tennis players